Origin is an American technical death metal band from Topeka, Kansas, founded in 1990 under the monikers Necrotomy and Thee Abomination. They have been recognized by music critics and metal fans alike for combining a harsh sound with a high level of technical skill.

Origin's music is characterized by almost exclusive use of several specific, difficult playing techniques: blast beats on the drum kit, multiple death growled vocals, and arpeggios and sweep picking on both the guitars and the bass guitar. Their songs often have uneven, shifting time signatures. 2008 saw the band breakthrough in the United States with the release of their fourth studio album, Antithesis, which was seen as a hit.

Biography

Beginnings
In the year 1990 Kansas natives Paul Ryan and Jeremy Turner got together to form a death metal group with the goal of making the music as technically proficient as they wanted it to be. They went through a few names at this time, the first was Necrotomy, which they went under from 1990-1993, then they were Thee Abomination. However, these bands didn't capture the exact sound they were seeking. Some time years later a new band took shape in 1997 in the span of half a year. Bassist Clint Appelhanz and vocalist Mark Manning joined in October 1997, and drummer George Fluke joined in January 1998. The band members then decided to tour under the name Origin.

On May 23, 1998, Origin opened for Suffocation. That summer, Origin recorded a four-song, self-financed and self-distributed demo, A Coming Into Existence. In October, the band secured an opening slot on the Death Across America Tour, which also featured Nile, Cryptopsy, Oppressor and Gorguts.

In February 1999, George Fluke was replaced by John Longstreth and Doug Williams replaced Clint Appelhanz. With the new lineup, Origin secured a show with Napalm Death on April 14. Various other regional shows followed, including a spot at the November to Dismember Metalfest in Texas. On December 16, Origin signed to Relapse Records.

Debut album
On July 11, 2000, Origin released its first studio album, Origin.
Origin played the March Metal Meltdown in New Jersey and was invited to take part in Contaminated 2000. They shared the stage with Exhumed and Cephalic Carnage, and participated in another November to December in California. Origin joined forces with Poland's Vader, along with label mates Cephalic Carnage and Dying Fetus, for the high-profile Death Across America 2000 Tour.
Soon after, Origin embarked on yet another tour, this time alongside Candiria, Cryptopsy and Poison the Well. They made another Milwaukee Metalfest appearance in 2001, and participated in Summer Slaughter that year (the 1st version of "Summer Slaughter Tour" under a different booking agency Digger). Origin then secured a headline tour before beginning work on another album. The result, Informis Infinitas Inhumanitas, introduced two new members, James Lee on vocals and Mike Flores on bass guitar.

Informis Infinitas Inhumanitas
The band's second album Informis Infinitas Inhumanitas was produced by the band with Colin E. Davis co-producing at Studio One in Racine, Wisconsin. Immediately following its release, Origin hit the road as part of a summer metal tour with Nile, Arch Enemy and Hate Eternal. Following the tour, Jeremy Turner resigned from the band and Clint Appelhanz (this time playing guitar instead of bass guitar) returned. Origin toured with Immolation, Vader, and The Berzerker, followed by another tour with All That Remains, Scar Culture and Crematorium. Unforeseen problems arose, and Origin had to cancel the tour with Nuclear Assault in January 2003. Shortly thereafter John Longstreth resigned from the band; James King was chosen to fill the spot.

The band played its first show with the new line-up in September 2003 in Topeka, Kansas. At the concert, they shot a music video for the song "Portal", from Informis Infinitas Inhumanitas. The band then landed a headlining west coast tour in January 2004 with Uphill Battle. In the summer, Origin toured the Midwest, playing the Milwaukee Metalfest 2004 and The Texas Death and Grindfest with label mates Soilent Green and Kill the Client.

Echoes of Decimation
On March 15, 2005, Origin released Echoes of Decimation, its third studio album. Fan reaction was mixed. A review of Echoes in the student newspaper of Metropolitan Community College-Longview in Kansas City called it monotonous, yet nonetheless impressive due to the band members' instrumental prowess.

Numerous United States tours immediately followed, including headlining performances at the New England Metal and Hardcore Festival and Ohio Deathfest. The band then joined forces with Malevolent Creation and Animosity for a summer North American tour that was sold out at many venues. The tour for Origin was 52 days long, and only three shows had to be cancelled.

In early 2006, James King and Clint Appelhanz left Origin, and had joined death metal/grindcore group Unmerciful, along with Jeremy Turner and Tony Reust. In April, John Longstreth returned to Origin, and in May, the band played their first European show. They also embarked on another summer headlining tour across North America, with Paul Ryan performing all guitar parts.

Antithesis
In February and March 2007, Origin played in Europe with label mates Misery Index and Necrophagist, as well as newly signed fellow Topeka locals Diskreet. After the end of this tour, Jeremy Turner rejoined Origin and the band began to work on its next album. They finished recording in February 2008, and the resulting album, Antithesis, was released April 1, 2008, and peaked at No. 21 on the Billboard Top Heatseekers chart. The band released a music video for the Antithesis song "Finite" on May 23, 2008. The video began to be shown on television the next day, premiering on MTV2's Headbangers Ball.

Entity
The band went to record their fifth album, Entity, as a trio of Paul Ryan, Mike Flores and John Longstreth. Vocals were done by Ryan and Flores as vocalist James Lee was ejected from the band in late 2010. Lee later went on to join Minnesota based death metal band Face of Oblivion. In 2010, the band signed to German-based Nuclear Blast Records and recorded their debut for the label in November. After releasing Entity, Origin recruited Jason Keyser of Skinless for vocal duties. The band embarked on a tour with Hate Eternal, Vital Remains and Abysmal Dawn in North America. Soon after, Origin left to tour Europe with Psycroptic and Leng Tch'e. The band also headlined the American "Occupation Domination" tour along with Cattle Decapitation, Decrepit Birth, Aborted, Rings of Saturn and Battlecross in 2012.

Discography

Studio albums
 Origin (2000)
 Informis Infinitas Inhumanitas (2002)
 Echoes of Decimation (2005)
 Antithesis (2008)
 Entity (2011)
 Omnipresent (2014)
 Unparalleled Universe (2017)
 Chaosmos (2022)

EPs
 A Coming into Existence (1998)

Compilations
 Abiogenesis – A Coming into Existence (2019)

Members

Current members
 Paul Ryan – guitars, backing vocals (1997–present)
 Mike Flores – bass, backing vocals (2001–present)
 John Longstreth – drums (1999–2003, 2006–present)
 Jason Keyser – lead vocals (2011–present)

Former members 
 Mark Manning – lead vocals (1997–2001)
 Clint Appelhanz – bass (1997–1999), guitars (2002–2006)
 Doug Williams – bass (1999–2001)
 George Fluke – drums (1998–1999)
 James King – drums (2003–2006)
 James Lee – lead vocals (2001–2010)
 Mica Meneke – lead vocals (2010–2011)
 Jeremy Turner – guitars, backing vocals (1997–2002, 2007–2010)

Timeline

References

External links
 
 Origin on Myspace

1998 establishments in Kansas
American technical death metal musical groups
Heavy metal musical groups from Kansas
Musical groups established in 1998
Musical quartets
Musicians from Topeka, Kansas
Relapse Records artists